Turbo bozzettiana is a species of sea snail, a marine gastropod mollusk in the family Turbinidae, the turban snails.

Description
The size of the shell varies between 15 mm and 18 mm.

Distribution
This species occurs in the Indian Ocean off Southern Somalia.

References

 Bozzetti L. (2011) Turbo bozzettiana (Gastropoda: Prosobranchia: Turbinidae) nuova specie dalla Somalia. Malacologia Mostra Mondiale 73: 15-16

External links
 To World Register of Marine Species

Endemic fauna of Somalia
bozzettiana
Gastropods described in 2011